German embassy may refer to:

 List of diplomatic missions of Germany
 List of diplomatic missions in Germany